Panogena is a genus of moths in the family Sphingidae. The genus was erected by Walter Rothschild and Karl Jordan in 1903.

Species
Panogena jasmini (Boisduval 1875)
Panogena lingens (Butler 1877)

References

Sphingini
Moth genera
Taxa named by Walter Rothschild
Taxa named by Karl Jordan